Gregory Jordan (born April 5, 1990, Naperville, Illinois, United States) is a former American soccer player.

Career

College
Jordan played college soccer at Creighton University between 2008 and 2011. During his time at Creighton, Jordan was named NSCAA All-American Second Team in 2011 as a senior, as well as the All-Missouri Valley Conference First Team as both a junior and senior.

Professional
Jordan was drafted in the second round (32nd overall) of the 2012 MLS SuperDraft by Philadelphia Union.

Jordan was loaned to USL Pro club Harrisburg City Islanders in June 2012.

The Union declined to renew Jordan's contract at the end of their 2013 season. He joined Minnesota United FC of the North American Soccer League ahead of the 2014 season.

Jordan joined the San Francisco Deltas ahead of the 2017 season. The San Francisco Deltas went on to win the 2017 NASL Championship where Jordan played all 90 minutes of the 2-0 win against the New York Cosmos.

Jordan signed with USL side Charlotte Independence for the 2018 season on February 28, 2018. Jordan left Charlotte at the end of their 2018 season.

Jordan is currently a successful girls soccer coach with the Gretna Elite Academy soccer club in Gretna, NE (a suburb of Omaha). Jordan coaches the 2008G ECNL team which has won back-to-back Nebraska State Cup Championships (2021, 2022).

Career statistics

Club

References

External links
 
 
 
 Creighton Bluejays Profile

1990 births
Living people
American soccer players
Creighton Bluejays men's soccer players
Philadelphia Union players
Penn FC players
Minnesota United FC (2010–2016) players
San Francisco Deltas players
Charlotte Independence players
Association football midfielders
Soccer players from Illinois
Sportspeople from Naperville, Illinois
Philadelphia Union draft picks
USL Championship players
North American Soccer League players